"Blood" (stylized as "BLOOD.") is a song by American rapper Kendrick Lamar, from his fourth studio album Damn, released on April 14, 2017. As the opening track on the album (fourteenth and final on the Collector's Edition of Damn), the song was written by Lamar, Daniel Tannenbaum, and Anthony Tiffith, and produced by Bēkon and Tiffith.

Composition 
The track consists of Lamar telling a story in which he is shot by a blind woman he's trying to help. According to Genius, the woman represents the consequences that leads to Damnation from the Book of Deuteronomy. The intro is followed by audio of Fox News' reporters criticizing Lamar.

Lamar himself has stated the intro as a struggle between wickedness and weakness, essentially the battle between good and evil.

Samples 
The track contains an excerpt from Fox News' The Five members Eric Bolling, Kimberly Guilfoyle, and Geraldo Rivera criticizing Lamar's performance of "Alright" at the 2015 BET Awards. Lamar would later call out Rivera and Fox News on the album's third track, "Yah".

Critical reception 
According to rap-up.com, the song is enough for one to say "DAMN." (a play on the title of the album), and begs the listener to "further analyze the flawed system [the song] dissects."

Credits and personnel 
Credits adapted from the official Damn digital booklet.
Kendrick Lamar – songwriter
Daniel Tannenbaum – songwriter
Anthony Tiffith – songwriter, producer
Bēkon – producer, additional vocals
Derek Ali – mixing
Tyler Page – mix assistant
Cyrus Taghipour – mix assistant

Charts

Certifications

References 

2017 songs
Kendrick Lamar songs
Songs written by Kendrick Lamar
Songs written by Daniel Tannenbaum